Christ Church Lutheran may refer to:

 Christ Church Lutheran (Minneapolis, Minnesota)
 Christ Church Lutheran (New York City)
 Old Christ Church Lutheran (New York City)